The Great Heart is a 1938 American short film about the life of Father Damien and is directed by David Miller. It was nominated for an Academy Award at the 11th Academy Awards in 1938 for Best Short Subject (One-Reel).

Cast
 Carey Wilson as Narrator
 Tom Neal as Father Damien (uncredited)

References

External links

1938 films
1938 short films
American black-and-white films
Metro-Goldwyn-Mayer short films
Films set in the 19th century
Films set in Hawaii
Films directed by David Miller
Cultural depictions of Father Damien
1930s English-language films